Liu Yanhan (born 19 January 1993 in Liaoning) is a Chinese volleyball player. She is an outside spiker and an opposite spiker. She won the 2015 and 2019 FIVB Volleyball Women's World Cup, and she was the Best Outside Spiker in 2019 FIVB Volleyball Women's Nations League.

Awards
 2010 U18 Asian Championship – "Best Spiker"
 2010 U18 Asian Championship – "Best Blocker"
 2010 U20 Asian Championship – "Best Spiker"
 2010 U20 Asian Championship – "Most Valuable Player"
 2014 Asian Cup – "Best Outside Spikers"
 2014–15 Chinese League – "Most Valuable Player"
 2015 U23 Asian Championship – "Most Valuable Player"
 2015 U23 Asian Championship – "Best Outside Spiker"
 2016 Asian Club Championship – "Best Outside Spiker"
 2018 Asian Cup – "Most Valuable Player"
 2019 FIVB Nations League – "Best Outside Spiker"

References

1993 births
Living people
Chinese women's volleyball players
Volleyball players from Liaoning
Asian Games medalists in volleyball
Volleyball players at the 2014 Asian Games
Asian Games silver medalists for China
Medalists at the 2014 Asian Games
Wing spikers
Volleyball players at the 2020 Summer Olympics
Olympic volleyball players of China
21st-century Chinese women